The Hôtel Lutetia, located at 45 Boulevard Raspail, in the Saint-Germain-des-Prés area of the 6th arrondissement of Paris, is one of the best-known hotels on the Left Bank. It is noted for its architecture and its historical role during the German occupation of France in World War II.

History

Early Years
The Lutetia was built in 1910 in the Art Nouveau style to designs by architects Louis-Charles Boileau and Henri Tauzin. It was founded by the Bon Marché department store, which sits opposite it facing Square Boucicaut. The Lutetia is located at the intersection of Boulevard Raspail and rue de Sèvres, adjacent to the Sèvres-Babylone Métro station. The hotel is named for an early pre-Roman town that existed where Paris is now located.

Famous guests over the years have included Pablo Picasso, Charles de Gaulle, Marianne Oswald, André Gide, Peggy Guggenheim and Josephine Baker. James Joyce wrote part of Ulysses at the hotel.   Dawn Powell lived at the Lutetia for three months in the fall of 1950, during her only visit to Europe.

World War II 
In the late 1930s, the Lutetia was a frequent gathering place for the anti-Nazi German exiles, among them Heinrich Mann, Willi Mutzner and the young Willi Brandt. In the Nazi regime's propaganda of the time, these exiles were called disparagingly "The Lutetia Crowd".

The war began in September 1939, and numerous refugees fled to Paris from conflict areas and places occupied by German forces. The Lutetia attempted to accommodate as many as possible. Because of its reputation, it was filled with a number of displaced artists and musicians. However, the French government evacuated Paris beginning June 14, 1940 and the Germans entered and occupied the city. A number of the Lutetia's residents escaped; others were captured by the Germans. The hotel itself was requisitioned by the Abwehr (counter-espionage), and used to house, feed, and entertain the officers in command of the occupation, such as Alfred Toepfer and the French collaborator Rudy de Mérode.

When Paris was liberated in August 1944, the hotel was abandoned by German troops, and taken over by French and American forces. From then until after the end of the war, it was used as a repatriation center for prisoners of war, displaced persons, and returnees from the German concentration camps.

Recent history 
As Paris returned to normality, the Lutetia was restored to its previous state as a luxury hotel. It was acquired by the Taittinger family in 1955. In the late 1980s, designer Sonia Rykiel opened a boutique in the building, and supervised a major redesign intended to recreate the Art Deco style of earlier decades.

Taittinger's Groupe du Louvre controlled the hotel for many years as part of their Concorde Hotels & Resorts chain. Following Taittinger's sale to Starwood Capital in 2005, Starwood sold the Hôtel Lutetia to the Israeli Alrov group in 2010 for 150 Million Euros. Alrov closed the hotel in April 2014 for what was planned as a 100-million Euro renovation. The building's contents were sold at auction in May 2014. It reopened in July 2018, following a $234 million restoration, managed by The Set Hotels group.

Access

Bibliography
 Pierre Assouline: Lutetia, Paris : Gallimard, 2005

Gallery

References

External links

 Hotel Lutetia (Hotel official website)
 Hotel Lutetia (Hotel blog)
 Auction Catalogs  05/19/2014: PART1 PART2 BISCH WINES

Hotels in Paris
Hotel Lutetia
Hotel Lutetia
Hotel Lutetia
Hotels established in 1910
Art Nouveau hotels
Hotel buildings completed in 1910
Intelligence agency headquarters
German occupation of France during World War II
1910 establishments in France